Plantago tweedyi, Tweedy's plantain, is a perennial herb in the plantain family. It is native to the western United States, from New Mexico and Arizona north to Montana.

Taxonomy
Plantago tweedyi was described and published in 1886 by Asa Gray, who named it in honor of Frank Tweedy, the first to collect it. Tweedy's specimen, the holotype, is deposited in Gray Herbarium at Harvard.

In 1976, Plantago tweedyi was reclassified as P. eriopoda var. tweedyi by Bernard Boivin. In the Flora of North America (2019), Shipunov recognizes it as a full species.

Description

Distribution
Plantago tweedyi is native to the western United States, from northern New Mexico and northern Arizona north through Utah, Colorado and Wyoming to Idaho and Montana. It grows in grasslands, sagebrush steppe, meadows, and on dry somewhat rocky hillsides at 1600–4000 m elevation.

History
Tweedy's Plantain was named by Asa Gray in honor of botanist Frank Tweedy, who made the first collection from grassy slopes along the East Fork of the Yellowstone River. At the time, he was working as a topographer for the US Geological Survey in Yellowstone National Park.

References

External links

tweedyi
Flora of the United States